X-Ray Records is an American independent record label specializing in hip hop music.

History 
X-Ray Records is an imprint under the Cleopatra Records, Inc. label group that focuses on hip hop and modern R&B. The imprint began in 2000 just as the label was starting to diversify after predominantly focusing on gothic and industrial music throughout the late ‘90s. It made an auspicious start with SX-10, the hip hop/metal hybrid featuring Sen Dog of Cypress Hill. Releases from KRS-One, Mellow Man Ace, Gravediggaz, Junior M.A.F.I.A. and Westside Connection followed.

The burgeoning imprint achieved a first for the Cleopatra family in 2005 when the album It's Not a Game by Bone-Thugs-N-Harmony member Layzie Bone landed on the Billboard Top 100 chart. That attracted more talent to the roster, including notorious hip hop outlaw DMX, P. Diddy prodigy Loon, Pastor Troy, Coolio, Afroman, and Vanilla Ice.

In 2018, X-Ray Records staged another major foray into the world of hip hop with releases by Gunplay, Riff Raff, Onyx, Luniz, Black Sheep, Petey Pablo, Brokencyde, Lil Reese, Ca$his, and R&B icon Case. The year culminated in one of the imprint’s highest-profile releases ever, the new studio album from Wu-Tang Clan member Ghostface Killah, The Lost Tapes, and two remix albums released simultaneously as The Ghost Files.

In addition to well-established artists, the label has begun to partner with new and up-and-coming acts such as Reggie Mills, Young Syrup, ITSOKTOCRY, Angela Mazzanti, as well as several artists from Chief Keef’s Glo Gang roster including Lil Flash, Ballout, and others.

Roster

Notable guests 
 Killah Priest 
 Twista 
 Spider Loc
 Mozzy
 Royce da 5'9
 Rick Ross
 Chief Keef
 Plies
 Andrew Kishino
 Horizon Taxicrab

See also 
 List of record labels
 List of hip hop record labels

References

External links
 Official site
 X-Ray Records
 X-Ray Records discogs.com
 X-Ray Records on Allmusic.com

American hip hop record labels
American independent record labels
Record labels established in 2000